Zichang is a city in Yan'an Shaanxi, China.

Zichang is also the courtesy name of:

Gongye Chang, disciple of Confucius
Sima Qian (145/135 – 86 BC), Han dynasty historian